The Neighbors of Woodcraft Building, also known as the Tiffany Center, is a building located in southwest Portland, Oregon, listed on the National Register of Historic Places.  Construction of the building was commissioned by the Neighbors of Woodcraft (NOW), a non-profit fraternal benefit society based in Oregon since 1905 and operating in several western states, for use as a national headquarters and clubhouse.  The building was completed in May 1929 and dedicated in June.  In 1993, NOW sold the building and moved out of its remaining office space there.  The building was added to the National Register in February 1996.

See also
 National Register of Historic Places listings in Southwest Portland, Oregon

References

1928 establishments in Oregon
Buildings and structures completed in 1928
Commercial buildings on the National Register of Historic Places in Oregon
Clubhouses on the National Register of Historic Places in Oregon
Goose Hollow, Portland, Oregon
Moderne architecture in Oregon
National Register of Historic Places in Portland, Oregon
Portland Historic Landmarks